Francesco Forti and Giulio Zeppieri were the defending champions but chose not to defend their title.

Guido Andreozzi and Guillermo Durán won the title after defeating Romain Arneodo and Jonathan Eysseric 6–1, 2–6, [10–6] in the final.

Seeds

Draw

References

External links
 Main draw

Internazionali di Tennis Città di Todi - Doubles
2022 Doubles